Hu or Huwa (Arabic: هُوَ meaning “He”) is a name for God in Sufism. Literally, Hebrew, Aramaic, and Arabic for the English third person and its variation as "Hu" is used in Sufism to avoid attribution of a gender to Allah.

Usage 
In Sufism Hu or Huwa is the pronoun used with Allah or God, and is used as a name of God. Allah Hu means "God, Just He!" In Arabic Allah means God and with Hu, as an intensive added to Allah, means "God himself." Hu is also found in a variant of the first part of the Islamic credo, wherein lā ilāha illā Allāh "there is no god but God," is shortened to lā ilāha illā Hu(wa) meaning "There is no God but He".

Gender 
Huwa is grammatically gendered but does not refer necessarily to a sex or gender of its referent.
Some scholars even make the point that there is no meaning or symbolism assigned to biological sex in the Quran.

References

Names of God in Sufism